The 1997 FIBA Africa Championship for Women was the 14th FIBA Africa Championship for Women, played under the rules of FIBA, the world governing body for basketball, and the FIBA Africa thereof. The tournament was hosted by Kenya from December 12 to 20, 1997.

Senegal defeated DR Congo 73–59 in the final to win their eighth title  with both winner and runner-up qualifying for the 1998 FIBA Women's World Cup and the 2000 Summer Olympics.

Draw

Preliminary round

Group A

Group B

Knockout stage

Semifinals

7th place match

5th place match

Bronze medal match

Final

Final standings

Awards

External links
Official Website

References

1997 FIBA Africa Championship for Women
1997 FIBA Africa Championship for Women
AfroBasket Women
International basketball competitions hosted by Kenya